Kuopiorock (also Kuopio Rockcock or simply Rockcock) is a Finnish two- to three-day rock music festival held annually in Väinölänniemi, Kuopio, at the turn of July and August. The first event was held in 2003. In 2012, the event celebrated its 10th anniversary and the festival was held on 27–28 July.

In connection with the event, there is a Campcock campsite. Väinölänniemi will be fenced throughout the event. In addition, several club gigs will be played around the city of Kuopio and a band race will be held in early summer, with the winner getting to perform in Rockcock. In 2006, Rockcock's novelty was Hevikaraoke. By 2007, the festival's event area expanded to include large Väinölänniemi Beach in the shore of Lake Kallavesi and the park area at the base of the peninsula, and the Peräniemi casino was added as a fourth stage. In 2012, the performance stage, located on the beach across the road, was moved to the sports stadium as the main stage.

In 2015, a fifth stage, Väinö Stage, was added to Kuopiorock, which is located on the beach next to Cafe Väinö.

As the event expands, alternative venues have also been considered. One of the proposed sites is the Sorsasalo racetrack, which would reduce noise and litter nuisance to the surrounding population, but the location would be more difficult to reach. With the advent of the 2010s, criticism and talk of the event has subsided.

Main acts
2007
Sepultura
2008
Cradle of Filth
2009
Misfits
Kreator
2010
The Baseballs
2011
Danko Jones
W.A.S.P.
2012
Nightwish
2013
Helloween
2014
Scorpions
2015
Accept
Children of Bodom
2016
Whitesnake
2017
Megadeth
2018
Billy Idol
Helloween
2019
The Offspring
Sabaton

Coming
2021
Nightwish
Within Temptation

See also
 Ilosaarirock

References

External links

Kuopiorock - Official Site (in Finnish)

Rock festivals in Finland
Kuopio
Summer events in Finland